Gateshead Interchange is a Tyne and Wear Metro station, serving the town of Gateshead in Tyne and Wear, England. It joined the network on 15 November 1981, following the opening of the third phase of the network, between Haymarket and Heworth.

History

The design of the station is very different from the underground stations in central Newcastle, due to the different rock structure south of the River Tyne. The running tunnels are square, rather than circular in cross-section, with the station excavated as a box.

Keith Grant's Night and Day artworks were commissioned for the station in the early 1980s, at opposite ends of the station at  platform level. The artwork consists of two mosaic mountain peaks, set against the backdrop of a day and night sky.

Upon leaving the station (trains towards Newcastle), a second art installation is visible in the tunnel. Elizabeth Wright's Space Travel was commissioned in 2005, and showcases a series of 115 images which read like a short animated film strip.

Facilities 
Step-free access is available at all stations across the Tyne and Wear Metro network, with a lift providing step-free access to platforms at Gateshead. The station is equipped with ticket machines, seating, next train information displays, timetable posters, and an emergency help point. Ticket machines are able to accept payment with credit and debit card (including contactless payment), notes and coins. The station is fitted with automatic ticket barriers, which were installed at 13 stations across the network during the early 2010s, as well as smartcard validators, which feature at all stations. 

There is no dedicated car parking available at the station, however there are a number of pay and display car parks operated by Gateshead Council located nearby. A taxi rank is located on Walker Terrace. There is the provision for cycle parking, with four cycle lockers, five cycle racks and five cycle pods available for use. A large bus interchange is located on the upper level, providing frequent connections across the region.

Services 
, the station is served by up to ten trains per hour on weekdays and Saturday, and up to eight trains per hour during the evening and on Sunday.

Rolling stock used: Class 599 Metrocar

Bus station
Gateshead Interchange is located above the Tyne and Wear Metro station. It originally opened on 15 November 1981, and upon opening, was operated by Northern General – despite being designed in the house style of the Tyne and Wear PTE.

The original bus station was demolished and re-built in the early 2000s, to a design by Jefferson Sheard Architects. It was officially re-opened on 29 March 2004, by the then Secretary of State for Transport, Alistair Darling. The building houses a number of shops and services, as well as a Nexus TravelShop.

It is served by Arriva North East and Go North East's local bus services, with frequent routes serving Gateshead and Newcastle upon Tyne, as well as County Durham, South Tyneside, Sunderland and Teesside. The bus station has 13 departure stands (lettered A–N), with an additional stand used by long-distance coach services. Each stand is fitted with seating, next bus information displays, and timetable posters.

References

External links
 
 Timetable and station information for Gateshead

Tyne and Wear Metro Green line stations
Tyne and Wear Metro Yellow line stations
Transport in Tyne and Wear
Bus stations in Tyne and Wear
1981 establishments in England
Railway stations in Great Britain opened in 1981
Railway stations located underground in the United Kingdom
Buildings and structures in Gateshead